The Autobots are the main protagonists in the fictional continuities of the Transformers multimedia franchise, and are depicted in a collection of various toys, cartoons, films, graphic novels, and paperback books first introduced in 1984. The Autobots, led by Optimus Prime, are opposed by the Decepticons, the main antagonists in the universe of the Transformers, headed by Megatron. Both Autobots and Decepticons have "sparks", which function as souls and contain their minds and personality. They can transform into machines, vehicles and other familiar mechanical objects, as well as mimic organic lifeforms (Dinobots). Autobots typically transform into cars, trucks and other road vehicles; some exceptions transform into aircraft, military vehicles, communication devices, weapons, or robotic animals. These Autobots are often grouped into special "teams" that have the suffix "-bot" at the end, such as in Dinobot (Decepticon groups' names end in "-con").

In Italy, they are called "Autorobots". The Autobot insignia is also sometimes referred to as an "Autobrand" in issue #14 of the Marvel Comics series. The descendants of the Autobots, the Maximals from Transformers: Beast Wars, are also known as Cybertrons in Japan.

In the Michael Bay live action films, as well as in the CGI-animated series Transformers: Prime, the title Autobots is explained to be the short version of the title Autonomous Robotic Organisms.

Transformers: Generation 1
In all Transformers stories, the Autobots and their adversaries, the Decepticons, originated on the planet Cybertron. The planet is almost always depicted as a purely metallic body. The capital of Cybertron is Iacon. In later issues of the Marvel comic line, Cybertron is shown to have weather, such as rain.

Transformers: Aligned
 
A group of Autobots (referred to as Team Prime) appear in the 2010 computer animated series Transformers: Prime, led by Optimus Prime. The video game Transformers: War for Cybertron give a backstory to the Autobots days on Cybertron.

Transformers: Prime  The Game
Set within an alternate timeline that parallels the show's second season, the Autobots (Team Prime) appear in Transformers: Prime  The Game. Optimus Prime, Arcee, Bulkhead, Bumblebee, Ratchet, Jack, Miko and Raf embark on a journey to defeat the villainous Megatron and the Decepticons in his plan to use his secret new weapon. The Decepticons intercept a mysterious meteor approaching the Earth, and the Autobots arrive to try and thwart the Decepticons' plans. A massive eruption of power during the battle on the meteor breaks out, and the Autobots become separated from Jack, Miko and Raf, who are monitoring them at base. Unknown to the Autobots and their human friends, the Decepticons have uncovered Thunderwing, an ancient power that they will use to try to take over the Earth.

Transformers: Prime
In Transformers: Prime, with Cybertron dead, the Autobots scattered across the universe. A group landed on Earth consisting of Optimus Prime, Ratchet, Bumblebee, and Bulkhead and which Arcee and Cliffjumper join later. This small team of Autobots led by Optimus is rechristened Team Prime. During the final four episodes of the season, the Autobots unwillingly team up with Megatron to battle a legendary threat to Earth's existence, Unicron.

See also
 Decepticon

References

External links
 Autobots at TFWIKI.Net, The Transformers Wiki
 Marvel (US) Comics Transformers series, issues 1-80.
 Dreamwave Productions Transformers series.
 Marvel (UK) Comics Transformers series.
 Paramount/DreamWorks 2007 Transformers Film.
 Hasbro Transformers toy line, 1984 through present (both toys and packaging).

Extraterrestrial superheroes
Fictional characters introduced in 1984
Fictional extraterrestrial robots
Fictional revolutionary organizations
Fictional vehicles
Fictional warrior races
Robot superheroes
Superhero teams
Transformers characters